Medicine Lodge Township is a township in Barber County, Kansas, USA.  As of the 2000 census, its population was 2,573.

Geography
According to the USGS, it contains one cemetery, Highland.

The streams of Albee Creek, Amber Creek, Antelope Creek, Cedar Creek, Elm Creek, Hackberry Creek, Short Creek, Threemile Creek, Walnut Creek and West Branch Little Sandy Creek run through this township.

Transportation
Medicine Lodge Township contains one airport or landing strip, Medicine Lodge Airport.

References
 USGS Geographic Names Information System (GNIS)

External links
 City-Data.com

Townships in Barber County, Kansas
Townships in Kansas